Anthony Roy West FRSE, FRSC, FInstP, FIMMM (born 21 January 1947) is a British chemist and materials scientist, and Professor of Electroceramics and Solid State Chemistry at the Department of Materials Science and Engineering at the University of Sheffield.

Education
West was educated at The Harvey Grammar School and then University College Swansea where he gained a Bachelor of Science in chemistry in 1968.  He then moved to the University of Aberdeen where he completed a PhD in 1971 under the supervision of Fredrik P. Glasser.

He was appointed lecturer at the University of Aberdeen in 1971 and gained his Doctor of Science (DSc) from the university in 1984.  He became professor in chemistry in 1989. He then moved to the University of Sheffield in 1999 to become Head of the Department of Engineering Materials.

Research
West's research has covered the synthesis of new oxide materials, crystal structure determination and structure-property relations with particular focus on ionic, electronic and mixed ionic-electronic conduction.  This includes lithium ion conductors, oxygen ion conductor and superconductors.
He discovered the first 5-volt cathode material for lithium battery applications, .

One of his specialties has been development of the electrochemical impedance spectroscopy (see dielectric spectroscopy) technique for materials characterisation and electrical property measurements.  
He developed the impedance and modulus spectroscopy technique of data analysis with his colleague at Aberdeen, Malcolm Ingram and the Almond-West method for ac conductivity data analysis.

Promotion of solid state and materials chemistry
West's book Solid State Chemistry and its applications and its condensed version "Basic Solid State Chemistry" are well-regarded texts in the field and a recent updated version of the former as a student edition was published in 2014.

West was the founder of the RSC journal Journal of Materials Chemistry in 1991 and of the "Materials Chemistry" conference series in the UK, organising the first in Aberdeen in 1991.

Awards and honours
West was awarded the John B. Goodenough Award of the Royal Society of Chemistry in 2013 for "his outstanding contributions to our understanding of structure-composition-property relationships in oxide-based materials, and their application in solid state devices, and for his preeminent role in promoting materials chemistry."

West is a Fellow of the Royal Society of Chemistry, Fellow of the Institute of Physics, Fellow of the Institute of Materials, Minerals and Mining and a Fellow of the Royal Society of Edinburgh.

Awards:
2013 John B. Goodenough Award in Materials Chemistry, Royal Society of Chemistry
2009 Griffiths Medal and Prize, Institute of Materials, Minerals and Mining	
2008 Epsilon de Oro Award, Spanish Society of Ceramics and Glass	
2007 Chemical Record Lectureship, Chemical Societies of Japan	
2008/09 Catedra de Excelencia, Universidad Carlos III, Leganés, Spain
1996 Industrial Award in Solid State Chemistry, RSC
1988/89 Research Support Fellowship, Royal Society of Edinburgh
Honorary member of Materials Research Society of India

References

Fellows of the Royal Society of Edinburgh
Fellows of the Institute of Physics
Academics of the University of Sheffield
Living people
1947 births
20th-century British chemists
Fellows of the Royal Society of Chemistry
People educated at The Harvey Grammar School
Alumni of the University of Aberdeen
Alumni of Swansea University
21st-century British chemists
Academic journal editors
Solid state chemists
Fellows of the Institute of Materials, Minerals and Mining